The Apostolic Assemblies of Christ, Inc., Incorporated (AAofC), is a Christian Church in the Oneness Pentecostal tradition. The Church is episcopal in governance. The Apostolic Assemblies of Christ was founded as an ecclesiastical corporation under the statutes of the non-profit corporation laws of the United States. The purpose of the founding of the corporation was to provide an ecclesiastical body where all churches could feel free to worship God and where all churches would have representations on all levels. The founder and presiding bishop (emeritus) G. M. Boone started with 7 churches and currently there are 259 churches worldwide. From the beginning, the Apostolic Assemblies of Christ had a set goal and purpose to its very existence in order to exalt the name of Jesus Christ. The organization's headquarters is located in Detroit, Michigan.

History
The Apostolic Assemblies of Christ, Inc.(AAofC) is a predominantly African-American Pentecostal Christian denomination. Founded on March 20, 1970, by Presiding Bishop G.M. Boone. The meeting was held at the New Liberty Apostolic Faith Church in Detroit, Michigan. When founded, The A. A. of C. had 7 Churches & 3 States namely: 
 Bishop G.M. Boone - Michigan
Bishop Virgil H. Oates - Michigan
Elder Fred Majors - Ohio
Elder Willie J. Duncan - Michigan
Pastor Parilee Mitchell - Michigan
Elder James Ward - Tennessee
Elder Nebraska Edmond - Michigan 
1st Secretary - Evangelist Lovora J. Walker
1st Treasurer - Bishop Virgil H. Oates
**The Apostolic Assemblies of Christ was named by Pastor Parilee Mitchell.

Doctrine
The Apostolic Assemblies of Christ teaches and preaches the baptism by both water and fire: the baptism is in the name of Jesus and the infilling of the Holy Ghost with the evidence of speaking in tongues.

Presiding bishops
1970-2012: Bishop G. M. Boone of Detroit, MI (Emeritus)
2012–2017: Bishop Donald Sorrells of Lockland, OH

Executive structure
The church has corporate officers, which include the president, vice president, general secretary and treasurer.

BISHOP G.M. BOONE, D.D. ~ Establishmentarian
THE LATE, BISHOP DONALD SORRELLS, D.D. ~ Presiding Bishop 
 ~ Asst. Presiding Bishop  
BISHOP RICHARD W. MAHONE ~ Executive Secretary
BISHOP NATHANIEL D. JORDAN, D.D. ~ Financial Secretary
BISHOP MARVIN D. MITCHELL ~ Treasurer

Ecclesiastical structure
The leadership of the AAofC consists of a presiding bishop and a board of bishops. The board also includes emeritus bishops who once served but are either semi or fully retired.

Under the oversight of the board of bishops are geographical units called councils. Councils correspond to state or national boundaries and each council is headed by a diocesan bishop, who is appointed by the board of bishops. A diocesan bishop can have assistants, called jurisdictional bishops. These jurisdictional bishops hold only the authority given them by the diocesan bishop. Typically they will have authority over a region or part of a state. Reporting under the jurisdictional bishop are district elders, who oversee and assist the elders (pastors and their churches) in his district.

Current councils
Michigan State Council (organized July 1970)/Bishop Marvin D. Mitchell – Diocesan Bishop
Central District Council (organized May 1975)/Bishop Nathaniel D. Jordan, D.D. – Diocesan Bishop
Southern District Council (organized November 1980)/Bishop W.T. Walton Jr. – Diocesan Bishop
Illinois-Indiana District Council (organized April 1981)/Bishop William L. Harris Sr., D.D. – Diocesan Bishop
Eastern District Council (organized November 1990)/Bishop Ernest Clay, D. Min. - Diocesan Bishop
Gulf State Council (organized October 2000/Bishop Richard L. Brown – Diocesan Bishop
California State Council (organized August 2006)/Bishop Arthur Earl Newman, B. Th. – Diocesan Bishop
Tennessee Carolina Council (organized October 2008)/Bishop Isaac Williams, D. Min. – Diocesan Bishop
Texas State Council (organized March 2013)/Bishop Paul Bell – Diocesan Bishop

Women in ministry
Women in ministry are recognized and widely accepted. Women are given liberty to function as licensed ministers, ordained evangelist, and pastors. They can also hold council and national offices. However, according to the by-laws they cannot hold the episcopal ranks of district elder, suffragan bishop, or bishop.

Auxiliary departments
INTERNATIONAL APOSTOLIC WOMEN - Dr. Thelma Sorrells, Chairlady
NATIONAL BROTHERHOOD - District Elder Dr. Olgen Williams, Chairman
NATIONAL FOREIGN MISSIONS - Sister C. Jeanette Carter, Chairlady 
NATIONAL HOME MISSIONS - Pastor Dr. Christine Grant, Chairlady
NATIONAL SUNDAY SCHOOL - District Elder Terrance Mickens, Superintendent
NATIONAL YOUNG PEOPLE’S AUXILIARY - Elder Mark Moore Jr., President

Auxiliary bishops
 Bishop Arthur Earl Newman, B. Th. - National Home Mission
 Bishop Nathaniel D. Jordan, D.D. - International Apostolic Women
 Bishop Arthur Cohens - National Brotherhood
 Bishop Richard L. Brown - National Missionary
 Bishop Johnny L. Davis - National Sunday School
 Bishop Isaac Williams, D. Min. - National Young People

A. A. of C. calendar of events
March- Mid-Winter Pastors & Workers Convention (National Meeting)
April- National Youth Convention (National Meeting) 
July- Annual National Convention (National Meeting) Normally held in various cities across the United States

Related organizations
 Pentecostal Assemblies of the World - The grandmother denomination of the Apostolic Assemblies of Christ.
 Pentecostal Churches of the Apostolic Faith - Mother denomination of the Apostolic Assemblies of Christ. Bishop Boone was ordained elder by Bishop S. N. Hancock, served as district elder and chairman of the Michigan State Council, and was elevated to the office of bishop against his own objections.

Historically African-American Christian denominations
Christian organizations established in 1970
Oneness Pentecostal denominations
Pentecostal denominations established in the 20th century
1970 establishments in the United States